Webber (/ˈwɛbər/) is an English occupational surname meaning weaver.

Etymology 
Webber is an occupational surname referring to, "a maker of cloth". The ending "er" generally denotes some employment, examples include Miller and Salter. The ending "er" is the masculine form whilst "ster", as in Webster, is the feminine form.

Variants of the name include Weaver, Webbe, Webster and Weber, the German form of the name.

Notable people with the surname Webber 
Pamela Balash-Webber (1953-2020), American diving instructor
A. R. F. Webber (1880–1932), Trinidadian writer
Andrew Lloyd Webber (born 1948), British composer
Bonnie Webber (born 1946), computational linguist
Chris Webber (born 1973), American basketball player
Charles Wilkins Webber (1819–1856), American journalist and explorer
Danny Webber (born 1981), English footballer
Darren Webber (born 1981), Australian politician
Diane Webber (1932–2008), American model and actress
Elizabeth Webber, fictional character in TV series General Hospital
George W. Webber (politician) (1825–1900), U.S. Representative
Gordon Webber (disambiguation), several people
Herbert John Webber (1865–1946), American plant physiologist 
John Webber (1752–1793), Swiss-English painter 
Jules C. Webber (1838-1872), American Civil War brevet brigadier general
Julian Lloyd Webber (born 1951), British solo cellist, conductor and broadcaster 
Mark Webber (disambiguation), several people
Michael Webber (born 1971), American mechanical engineer
Michael Webber (priest), Dean of Hobart
Michael Webber (politician) (born 1978), American politician
Melvin M. Webber (1920–2006), American urban designer and theorist
Peter Webber, British film director
Rob Webber, English rugby union player
Robert Webber, American actor
Robert E. Webber, American theologian
Ruth Webber, Australian politician
Samuel Webber (1759–1810), American clergyman, mathematician and academic
Sharon Webber, American surfer
Sian Webber, British actress
Stacey Lee Webber (born 1982), American metalsmith
Stephen Webber (born 1983), American politician
Steve Webber, American baseball coach
Teresa Webber, British palaeographer, medievalist, and academic
 Walter Webber, Western Cherokee leader and trader, founder of present-day Webbers Falls, Oklahoma
William B. Webber (1836-1916), American lawyer and politician
William John Seward Webber (1842–1919), British sculptor

See also 
 Lloyd Webber, a surname
 Paine Webber, an American company
 Weber (surname)

References

English-language surnames
Occupational surnames
English-language occupational surnames